Mal Sanan (also Romanized as Māl Sanān and Māl Senān; also known as Mala-i-Sana and Māl Saneh) is a village in Liravi-ye Jonubi Rural District, Imam Hassan District, Deylam County, Bushehr Province, Iran. At the 2006 census, its population was 87, in 21 families.

References 

Populated places in Deylam County